Wang Xiyu (born 28 March 2001) is a Chinese tennis player. On 9 January 2023, she reached her career-high singles ranking of world No. 49. On 27 May 2019, she peaked at No. 240 in the WTA doubles rankings.

Junior career

Junior Grand Slam performance
Singles:
 Australian Open: QF (2018)
 French Open: QF (2018)
 Wimbledon: SF (2018)
 US Open: W (2018)

Doubles:
 Australian Open: SF (2018)
 French Open: SF (2017)
 Wimbledon: W (2018)
 US Open: F (2017)

Wang became junior world No. 1 on 10 September 2018, right after she won her only singles Grand Slam title at the 2018 US Open, defeating Clara Burel in the final. The same year, she finished as quarterfinalist on the Australian Open and French Open and then as semifinalist on Wimbledon, all in singles. In doubles, she also has won one Grand Slam title at the 2018 Wimbledon, partnering with Wang Xinyu, and finished as runner-up at the 2017 US Open, alongside Lea Bošković. She also reached semifinals at the 2017 French Open and 2018 Australian Open. On the ITF Junior Circuit, she has won six singles and eight doubles titles.

Professional career

2016–17: First steps
Wang made her ITF Women's Circuit debut in 2016 at the $10k event in Anning as a wildcard player. Despite the loss in her first match, the following week she reached semifinal at the $10k event in the same city. In October 2017, she made her WTA main-draw debut at the 2017 Tianjin Open, where she also recorded her first win over Danka Kovinić.

2018: Improvement
Season of 2018 was her breakthrough. In the early season, she reached quarterfinal at the $60k Burnie International, and soon after that she played at the Premier Mandatory Miami Open, but failed to qualify. In April, she recorded her first win on the WTA Challenger Tour, defeating Naomi Broady in order to reach second round of the Zhengzhou Open. In August, she won her first ITF singles title, defeating Barbora Štefková in the final of $25k event in Nonthaburi. She then finished as runner-up at the another $25k event in Nonthaburi and win title at the $25k event in Tsukuba. Her last tournament of the season was the Wuhan Open, where she made debut at Premier 5-level tournaments. There, she recorded a win over wildcard player Bernarda Pera, before she lost in a tense match against Daria Kasatkina.

2019: Grand Slam debut, top 150 debut
Wang reached another quarterfinal at Burnie. In March, she made her debut at the Premier Mandatory level tournaments, reaching second round of Miami Open. There she also recorded her first win on that level, defeating Monica Puig in the first round. In April, she reached final at the $25k event in Osaka and one month later won her first bigger title at the $60k event in La Bisbal d'Emporda, defeating Dalma Gálfi in the final. In June, she reached quarterfinals at the $100k Manchester Trophy. Unlike the first three majors of the year, Wang reached the main draw at the US Open, but lost to Kirsten Flipkens in the first round. Later, she had first-round losses at the Wuhan Open and China Open, but ended one round further at the Tianjin Open.

2020-22: First WTA Tour SF & major win & third round, top 50

Wang started the year with a win over Sorana Cîrstea at the Shenzhen Open, but then lost to third seed Elise Mertens. However, she failed to reach the main draw of the Australian Open, Wang reached quarterfinals of the Hua Hin Championships, where she defeated world No. 15, Petra Martić. She followed this up with a semifinal at the Mexican Open; after three wins, she lost to Heather Watson.

At the 2022 Australian Open, she recorded her first Grand Slam career match-win, as a wildcard against qualifier Viktória Kužmová.

She reached a new career-high singles ranking of world No. 103, on 9 May 2022, and made her top 100 debut a month later on 13 June 2022, after reaching her first WTA Challenger final at the Open de Valencia.
She made her debut at Wimbledon where she lost in the first round to another debutante at this major, Jule Niemeier.

At the Budapest Grand Prix, she defeated top seed Barbora Krejčíková in the first round and overcame Ana Bogdan in the longest straight-sets match of the year, in 2 hours and 45 minutes in the second round to move to the quarterfinals. As a result, she recorded a new career-high of No. 93, on 18 July 2022.

On 31 August, Wang defeated third seeded Maria Sakkari to enter round three of the US Open in which she lost to Alison Riske-Amritraj, in three sets.

She ended the year ranked in the top 50 on 7 November 2022.

Performance timeline

Only main-draw results in WTA Tour, Grand Slam tournaments, Fed Cup/Billie Jean King Cup and Olympic Games are included in win–loss records.

Singles
Current after the 2023 Indian Wells Open.

Doubles

WTA Challenger finals

Singles: 1 (runner-up)

ITF Circuit finals

Singles: 9 (3 titles, 6 runner-ups)

Doubles: 6 (3 titles, 3 runner-ups)

Junior Grand Slam finals

Girls' singles: 1 (title)

Girls' doubles: 2 (1 title, 1 runner-up)

Head to head

Record against top 10 players
Wang's record against players who have been ranked in the top 10. Active players are in boldface.

Top 10 wins

Notes

References

External links
 
 
 

2001 births
Living people
Sportspeople from Wuxi
Chinese female tennis players
Wimbledon junior champions
Tennis players at the 2018 Summer Youth Olympics
Grand Slam (tennis) champions in girls' singles
Grand Slam (tennis) champions in girls' doubles
21st-century Chinese women